The group stage of the 2008 CAF Confederation Cup was played from 16 August to 19 October 2008. A total of eight teams competed in the group stage.

Format
In the group stage, each group was played on a home-and-away round-robin basis. The winners of each group advanced directly to the final.

Groups

Group A

Group B

References

External links
2008 CAF Confederation Cup - goalzz.com

Group stage